An earthworm is a terrestrial invertebrate that belongs to the phylum Annelida. They exhibit a tube-within-a-tube body plan; they are externally segmented with corresponding internal segmentation; and they usually have setae on all segments. They occur worldwide where soil, water, and temperature allow.

Earthworms are commonly found in soil, eating a wide variety of organic matter. This organic matter includes plant matter, living protozoa, rotifers, nematodes, bacteria, fungi, and other microorganisms. An earthworm's digestive system runs the length of its body.

An earthworm respires (breathes) through its skin. It has a double transport system made of coelomic fluid that moves within the fluid-filled coelom and a simple, closed circulatory system.

It has a central and peripheral nervous system. Its central nervous system consists of two ganglia above the mouth, one on either side, connected to a nerve running along its length to motor neurons and sensory cells in each segment. Large numbers of chemoreceptors concentrate near its mouth.

Circumferential and longitudinal muscles edging each segment let the worm move. Similar sets of muscles line the gut, and their actions move digesting food toward the worm's anus.

Earthworms are hermaphrodites: each carries male and female reproductive organs. When mating, two individual earthworms will exchange sperm and fertilize each other's eggs. Each individual has both male and female genital pores. As invertebrates, they lack a true skeleton, but they maintain their structure with fluid-filled coelom chambers that function as a hydrostatic skeleton.

"Earthworm" is the common name for the largest members of Oligochaeta (which is a class or subclass depending on the author). In classical systems, they were in the order Opisthopora since the male pores opened posterior to the female pores, although the internal male segments are anterior to the female. Theoretical cladistic studies have placed them in the suborder Lumbricina of the order Haplotaxida, but this may soon change. Folk names for the earthworm include "dew-worm", "rainworm", "nightcrawler", and "angleworm" (from its use as fishing bait).

Larger terrestrial earthworms are also called megadriles (translates to "big worms") as opposed to the microdriles ("small worms") in the semiaquatic families Tubificidae, Lumbricidae, and Enchytraeidae. The megadriles are characterized by a distinct clitellum (more extensive than that of microdriles) and a vascular system with true capillaries.

Anatomy

Form and function 

Probably the longest worm on confirmed records is Amynthas mekongianus that extends up to 3 m (10 ft)  in the mud along the banks of the 4,350 km (2,703 mi) Mekong River in Southeast Asia.

From front to back, the basic shape of the earthworm is a cylindrical tube-in-a-tube, divided into a series of segments (called metameres) that compartmentalize the body. Furrows are generally externally visible on the body demarking the segments; dorsal pores and nephridiopores exude a fluid that moistens and protects the worm's surface, allowing it to breathe. Except for the mouth and anal segments, each segment carries bristlelike hairs called lateral setae used to anchor parts of the body during movement; species may have four pairs of setae on each segment or more than eight sometimes forming a complete circle of setae per segment. Special ventral setae are used to anchor mating earthworms by their penetration into the bodies of their mates.

Generally, within a species, the number of segments found is consistent across specimens, and individuals are born with the number of segments they will have throughout their lives. The first body segment (segment number 1) features both the earthworm's mouth and, overhanging the mouth, a fleshy lobe called the prostomium, which seals the entrance when the worm is at rest, but is also used to feel and chemically sense the worm's surroundings. Some species of earthworm can even use the prehensile prostomium to grab and drag items such as grasses and leaves into their burrow.

An adult earthworm develops a belt-shaped glandular swelling, called the clitellum, which covers several segments toward the front part of the animal. This is part of the reproductive system and produces egg capsules. The posterior is most commonly cylindrical like the rest of the body, but depending on the species, it may also be quadrangular, octagonal, trapezoidal, or flattened. The last segment is called the periproct; the earthworm's anus, a short vertical slit, is found on this segment.

The exterior of an individual segment is a thin cuticle over the skin, commonly pigmented red to brown, which has specialized cells that secrete mucus over the cuticle to keep the body moist and ease movement through the soil. Under the skin is a layer of nerve tissue, and two layers of muscles—a thin outer layer of circular muscle, and a much thicker inner layer of longitudinal muscle. Interior to the muscle layer is a fluid-filled chamber called a coelom that by its pressurization provides structure to the worm's boneless body. The segments are separated from each other by septa (the plural of "septum") which are perforated transverse walls, allowing the coelomic fluid to pass between segments. A pair of structures called nephrostomes are located at the back of each septum; a nephric tubule leads from each nephrostome through the septum and into the following segment. This tubule then leads to the main body fluid filtering organ, the nephridium or metanephridium, which removes metabolic waste from the coelomic fluid and expels it through pores called nephridiopores on the worm's sides; usually, two nephridia (sometimes more) are found in most segments. At the centre of a worm is the digestive tract, which runs straight through from mouth to anus without coiling, and is flanked above and below by blood vessels (the dorsal blood vessel and the ventral blood vessel as well as a subneural blood vessel) and the ventral nerve cord, and is surrounded in each segment by a pair of pallial blood vessels that connect the dorsal to the subneural blood vessels.

Nervous system

Central nervous system 
The CNS consists of a bilobed brain (cerebral ganglia, or supra-pharyngeal ganglion), sub-pharyngeal ganglia, circum-pharyngeal connectives and a ventral nerve cord.

Earthworms' brains consist of a pair of pear-shaped cerebral ganglia. These are located in the dorsal side of the alimentary canal in the third segment, in a groove between the buccal cavity and pharynx.

A pair of circum-pharyngeal connectives from the brain encircle the pharynx and then connect with a pair of sub-pharyngeal ganglia located below the pharynx in the fourth segment. This arrangement means the brain, sub-pharyngeal ganglia and the circum-pharyngeal connectives form a nerve ring around the pharynx.

The ventral nerve cord (formed by nerve cells and nerve fibers) begins at the sub-pharyngeal ganglia and extends below the alimentary canal to the most posterior body segment. The ventral nerve cord has a swelling, or ganglion, in each segment, i.e. a segmental ganglion, which occurs from the fifth to the last segment of the body. There are also three giant axons, one medial giant axon (MGA) and two lateral giant axons (LGAs) on the mid-dorsal side of the ventral nerve cord. The MGA is 0.07 mm in diameter and transmits in an anterior-posterior direction at a rate of 32.2 m/s. The LGAs are slightly narrower at 0.05 mm in diameter and transmit in a posterior-anterior direction at 12.6 m/s. The two LGAs are connected at regular intervals along the body and are therefore considered one giant axon.

Peripheral nervous system 
Eight to ten nerves arise from the cerebral ganglia to supply the prostomium, buccal chamber and pharynx.
Three pairs of nerves arise from the subpharyangeal ganglia to supply the second, third and fourth segment.
Three pairs of nerves extend from each segmental ganglion to supply various structures of the segment.

The sympathetic nervous system consists of nerve plexuses in the epidermis and alimentary canal. (A plexus is a web of connected nerve cells.) The nerves that run along the body wall pass between the outer circular and inner longitudinal muscle layers of the wall. They give off branches that form the intermuscular plexus and the subepidermal plexus. These nerves connect with the cricopharyngeal connective.

Movement 
 
On the surface, crawling speed varies both within and among individuals. Earthworms crawl faster primarily by taking longer "strides" and a greater frequency of strides. Larger Lumbricus terrestris worms crawl at a greater absolute speed than smaller worms. They achieve this by taking slightly longer strides but with slightly lower stride frequencies.

Touching an earthworm, which causes a "pressure" response as well as (often) a response to the dehydrating quality of the salt on human skin (toxic to earthworms), stimulates the subepidermal nerve plexus which connects to the intermuscular plexus and causes the longitudinal muscles to contract. This causes the writhing movements observed when a human picks up an earthworm. This behaviour is a reflex and does not require the CNS; it occurs even if the nerve cord is removed. Each segment of the earthworm has its own nerve plexus. The plexus of one segment is not connected directly to that of adjacent segments. The nerve cord is required to connect the nervous systems of the segments.

The giant axons carry the fastest signals along the nerve cord. These are emergency signals that initiate reflex escape behaviours. The larger dorsal giant axon conducts signals the fastest, from the rear to the front of the animal. If the rear of the worm is touched, a signal is rapidly sent forwards causing the longitudinal muscles in each segment to contract. This causes the worm to shorten very quickly as an attempt to escape from a predator or other potential threat. The two medial giant axons connect with each other and send signals from the front to the rear. Stimulation of these causes the earthworm to very quickly retreat (perhaps contracting into its burrow to escape a bird).

The presence of a nervous system is essential for an animal to be able to experience nociception or pain. However, other physiological capacities are also required such as opioid sensitivity and central modulation of responses by analgesics. Enkephalin and α-endorphin-like substances have been found in earthworms. Injections of naloxone (an opioid antagonist) inhibit the escape responses of earthworms. This indicates that opioid substances play a role in sensory modulation, similar to that found in many vertebrates.

Sensory reception

Photosensitivity

Earthworms do not have eyes (although some worms do); however, they do have specialized photosensitive cells called "light cells of Hess". These photoreceptor cells have a central intracellular cavity (phaosome) filled with microvilli. As well as the microvilli, there are several sensory cilia in the phaosome which are structurally independent of the microvilli. The photoreceptors are distributed in most parts of the epidermis but are more concentrated on the back and sides of the worm. A relatively small number occurs on the ventral surface of the first segment. They are most numerous in the prostomium and reduce in density in the first three segments; they are very few in number past the third segment.

Epidermal receptor (Sense organ)

These receptors are abundant and distributed all over the epidermis. Each receptor shows a slightly elevated cuticle which covers a group of tall, slender and columnar receptor cells. These cells bear small hairlike processes at their outer ends and their inner ends are connected with nerve fibres. The epidermal receptors are tactile in function. They are also concerned with changes in temperature and respond to chemical stimuli. Earthworms are extremely sensitive to touch and mechanical vibration.

Buccal receptor (Sense organ)

These receptors are located only in the epithelium of the buccal chamber. These receptors are gustatory and olfactory (related to taste and smell). They also respond to chemical stimuli. (Chemoreceptor)

Digestive system 
The gut of the earthworm is a straight tube that extends from the worm's mouth to its anus. It is differentiated into an alimentary canal and associated glands which are embedded in the wall of the alimentary canal itself. The alimentary canal consists of a mouth, buccal cavity (generally running through the first one or two segments of the earthworm), pharynx (running generally about four segments in length), esophagus, crop, gizzard (usually), and intestine. 

Food enters at the mouth. The pharynx acts as a suction pump; its muscular walls draw in food. In the pharynx, the pharyngeal glands secrete mucus. Food moves into the esophagus, where calcium (from the blood and ingested from previous meals) is pumped in to maintain proper blood calcium levels in the blood and food pH. From there the food passes into the crop and gizzard. In the gizzard, strong muscular contractions grind the food with the help of mineral particles ingested along with the food. Once through the gizzard, food continues through the intestine for digestion. The intestine secretes pepsin to digest proteins, amylase to digest polysaccharides, cellulase to digest cellulose, and lipase to digest fats. Earthworms use, in addition to the digestive proteins, a class of surface active compounds called drilodefensins, which help digest plant material. Instead of being coiled like a mammalian intestine, in an earthworm's intestine a large mid-dorsal, tongue-like fold is present, called typhlosole which increases surface area to increase nutrient absorption by having many folds running along its length. The intestine has its own pair of muscle layers like the body, but in reverse order—an inner circular layer within an outer longitudinal layer.

Circulatory system 
Earthworms have a dual circulatory system in which both the coelomic fluid and a closed circulatory system carry the food, waste, and respiratory gases. The closed circulatory system has five main blood vessels: the dorsal (top) vessel, which runs above the digestive tract; the ventral (bottom) vessel, which runs below the digestive tract; the subneural vessel, which runs below the ventral nerve cord; and two lateroneural vessels on either side of the nerve cord.

The dorsal vessel is mainly a collecting structure in the intestinal region. It receives a pair commissural and dorsal intestines in each segment. The ventral vessel branches off to a pair of ventro-tegumentaries and ventro-intestinals in each segment. The subneural vessel also gives out a pair of commissurals running along the posterior surface of the septum.

The pumping action on the dorsal vessel moves the blood forward, while the other four longitudinal vessels carry the blood rearward. In segments seven through eleven, a pair of aortic arches ring the coelom and acts as hearts, pumping the blood to the ventral vessel that acts as the aorta. The blood consists of ameboid cells and haemoglobin dissolved in the plasma. The second circulatory system derives from the cells of the digestive system that line the coelom. As the digestive cells become full, they release non-living cells of fat into the fluid-filled coelom, where they float freely but can pass through the walls separating each segment, moving food to other parts and assist in wound healing.

Excretory system 
The excretory system contains a pair of nephridia in every segment, except for the first three and the last ones. The three types of nephridia are: integumentary, septal, and pharyngeal. The integumentary nephridia lie attached to the inner side of the body wall in all segments except the first two. The septal nephridia are attached to both sides of the septa behind the 15th segment. The pharyngeal nephridia are attached to the fourth, fifth and sixth segments. The waste in the coelom fluid from a forward segment is drawn in by the beating of cilia of the nephrostome. From there it is carried through the septum (wall) via a tube which forms a series of loops entwined by blood capillaries that also transfer waste into the tubule of the nephrostome. The excretory wastes are then finally discharged through a pore on the worm's side.

Respiration 
Earthworms have no special respiratory organs. Gases are exchanged through the moist skin and capillaries, where the oxygen is picked up by the haemoglobin dissolved in the blood plasma and carbon dioxide is released. Water, as well as salts, can also be moved through the skin by active transport.

Life and physiology 
At birth, earthworms emerge small but fully formed, lacking only their sex structures which develop in about 60 to 90 days. They attain full size in about one year. Scientists predict that the average lifespan under field conditions is four to eight years, while most garden varieties live only one to two years.

Reproduction 

Several common earthworm species are mostly parthenogenetic, meaning that growth and development of embryos happens without fertilization.
Among lumbricid earthworms, parthenogenesis arose from sexual relatives many times. Parthenogenesis in some Aporrectodea trapezoides lineages arose 6.4 to 1.1 million years ago from sexual ancestors. A few species exhibit pseudogamous parthogenesis, meaning that mating is necessary to stimulate reproduction, even though no male genetic material passes to the offspring.

Earthworm mating occurs on the surface, most often at night. Earthworms are hermaphrodites; that is, they have both male and female sexual organs. The sexual organs are located in segments 9 to 15. Earthworms have one or two pairs of testes contained within sacs. The two or four pairs of seminal vesicles produce, store and release the sperm via the male pores. Ovaries and oviducts in segment 13 release eggs via female pores on segment 14, while sperm is expelled from segment 15. One or more pairs of spermathecae are present in segments 9 and 10 (depending on the species) which are internal sacs that receive and store sperm from the other worm during copulation. As a result, segment 15 of one worm exudes sperm into segments 9 and 10 with its storage vesicles of its mate. Some species use external spermatophores for sperm transfer.

In Hormogaster samnitica and Hormogaster elisae transcriptome DNA libraries were sequenced and two sex pheromones, Attractin and Temptin, were detected in all tissue samples of both species. Sex pheromones are probably important in earthworms because they live in an environment where chemical signaling may play a crucial role in attracting a partner and in facilitating outcrossing. Outcrossing would provide the benefit of masking the expression of deleterious recessive mutations in progeny (see Complementation).

Copulation and reproduction are separate processes in earthworms. The mating pair overlap front ends ventrally and each exchanges sperm with the other. The clitellum becomes very reddish to pinkish in colour. Sometime after copulation, long after the worms have separated, the clitellum (behind the spermathecae) secretes material which forms a ring around the worm. The worm then backs out of the ring, and as it does so, it injects its own eggs and the other worm's sperm into it. Thus each worm becomes the genetic father of some of their offspring (due to its own sperm transferred to other earthworm) and the genetic mother (offsprings from its own egg cells) of the rest. As the worm slips out of the ring, the ends of the cocoon seal to form a vaguely onion-shaped incubator (cocoon) in which the embryonic worms develop. Hence fertilization is external. The cocoon is then deposited in the soil. After three weeks, 2 to 20 offspring hatch with an average of 4. Development is direct i.e. without formation of any larva.

Locomotion 

Earthworms travel underground by means of waves of muscular contractions which alternately shorten and lengthen the body (peristalsis). The shortened part is anchored to the surrounding soil by tiny clawlike bristles (setae) set along its segmented length. In all the body segments except the first, last and clitellum, there is a ring of S-shaped setae embedded in the epidermal pit of each segment (perichaetine). The whole burrowing process is aided by the secretion of lubricating mucus. As a result of their movement through their lubricated tunnels, worms can make gurgling noises underground when disturbed. Earthworms move through soil by expanding crevices with force; when forces are measured according to body weight, hatchlings can push 500 times their own body weight whereas large adults can push only 10 times their own body weight.

Regeneration 
Earthworms have the ability to regenerate lost segments, but this ability varies between species and depends on the extent of the damage. Stephenson (1930) devoted a chapter of his monograph to this topic, while G. E. Gates spent 20 years studying regeneration in a variety of species, but "because little interest was shown", Gates (1972) published only a few of his findings that, nevertheless, show it is theoretically possible to grow two whole worms from a bisected specimen in certain species.

Gates's reports included:
Eisenia fetida (Savigny, 1826) with head regeneration, in an anterior direction, possible at each intersegmental level back to and including 23/24, while tails were regenerated at any levels behind 20/21; thus two worms may grow from one.
Lumbricus terrestris (Linnaeus, 1758) replacing anterior segments from as far back as 13/14 and 16/17 but tail regeneration was never found.
Perionyx excavatus (Perrier, 1872) readily regenerated lost parts of the body, in an anterior direction from as far back as 17/18, and in a posterior direction as far forward as 20/21.
Lampito mauritii (Kinberg, 1867) with regeneration in anterior direction at all levels back to 25/26 and tail regeneration from 30/31; head regeneration was sometimes believed to be caused by internal amputation resulting from Sarcophaga sp. larval infestation.
Criodrilus lacuum (Hoffmeister, 1845) also has prodigious regenerative capacity with 'head' regeneration from as far back as 40/41.

An unidentified Tasmanian earthworm shown growing a replacement head has been reported.

Taxonomy and distribution 
Within the world of taxonomy, the stable 'Classical System' of Michaelsen (1900) and Stephenson (1930) was gradually eroded by the controversy over how to classify earthworms, such that Fender and McKey-Fender (1990) went so far as to say, "The family-level classification of the megascolecid earthworms is in chaos." Over the years, many scientists have developed their own classification systems for earthworms, which led to confusion, and these systems have been and still continue to be revised and updated. The classification system used here which was developed by Blakemore (2000), is a modern reversion to the Classical System that is historically proven and widely accepted.

Categorization of a megadrile earthworm into one of its taxonomic families under suborders Lumbricina and Moniligastrida is based on such features as the makeup of the clitellum, the location and disposition of the sex features (pores, prostatic glands, etc.), number of gizzards, and body shape. Currently, over 6,000 species of terrestrial earthworms are named, as provided in a species name database, but the number of synonyms is unknown.

The families, with their known distributions or origins:
 Acanthodrilidae
 Ailoscolecidae – the Pyrenees and the southeast USA
 Almidae – tropical equatorial (South America, Africa, Indo-Asia)
 Benhamiinae – Ethiopian, Neotropical (a possible subfamily of Octochaetidae)
 Criodrilidae – southwestern Palaearctic: Europe, Middle East, Russia and Siberia to Pacific coast; Japan (Biwadrilus); mainly aquatic
 Diplocardiinae/-idae – Gondwanan or Laurasian? (a subfamily of Acanthodrilidae)
 Enchytraeidae – cosmopolitan but uncommon in tropics (usually classed with Microdriles)
 Eudrilidae – Tropical Africa south of the Sahara
 Exxidae – Neotropical: Central America and the Caribbean
 Glossoscolecidae – Neotropical: Central and South America, Caribbean
 Haplotaxidae – cosmopolitan distribution (usually classed with Microdriles)
 Hormogastridae – Mediterranean
 Kynotidae – Malagasian: Madagascar
 Lumbricidae – Holarctic: North America, Europe, Middle East, Central Asia to Japan
 Lutodrilidae – Louisiana the southeast USA
 Megascolecidae
 Microchaetidae – Terrestrial in Africa especially South African grasslands
 Moniligastridae – Oriental and Indian subregion
 Ocnerodrilidae – Neotropics, Africa; India
 Octochaetidae – Australasian, Indian, Oriental, Ethiopian, Neotropical
 Octochaetinae – Australasian, Indian, Oriental (subfamily if Benhamiinae is accepted)
 Sparganophilidae – Nearctic, Neotropical: North and Central America
 Tumakidae – Colombia, South America

As an invasive species 

From a total of around 7,000 species, only about 150 species are widely distributed around the world. These are the peregrine or cosmopolitan earthworms.

Ecology 

Earthworms are classified into three main ecophysiological categories: (1) leaf litter- or compost-dwelling worms that are nonburrowing, live at the soil-litter interface and eat decomposing organic matter (epigeic) e.g. Eisenia fetida; (2) topsoil- or subsoil-dwelling worms that feed (on soil), burrow and cast within the soil, creating horizontal burrows in upper 10–30  cm of soil (endogeic); and (3) worms that construct permanent deep vertical burrows which they use to visit the surface to obtain plant material for food, such as leaves (anecic, meaning "reaching up"), e.g. Lumbricus terrestris.

Earthworm populations depend on both physical and chemical properties of the soil, such as temperature, moisture, pH, salts, aeration, and texture, as well as available food, and the ability of the species to reproduce and disperse. One of the most important environmental factors is pH, but earthworms vary in their preferences. Most favour neutral to slightly acidic soils. Lumbricus terrestris is still present in a pH of 5.4, Dendrobaena octaedra at a pH of 4.3 and some Megascolecidae are present in extremely acidic humic soils. Soil pH may also influence the numbers of worms that go into diapause. The more acidic the soil, the sooner worms go into diapause, and remain in diapause the longest time at a pH of 6.4.

Earthworms are preyed upon by many species of birds (e.g. robins, starlings, thrushes, gulls, crows), snakes, wood turtles, mammals (e.g. bears, boars, foxes, hedgehogs, pigs, moles) and invertebrates (e.g. ants, flatworms, ground beetles and other beetles, snails, spiders, and slugs). Earthworms have many internal parasites, including protozoa, platyhelminthes, mites, and nematodes; they can be found in the worms' blood, seminal vesicles, coelom, or intestine, or in their cocoons (e.g. the mite Histiostoma murchiei is a parasite of earthworm cocoons).

Nitrogenous fertilizers tend to create acidic conditions, which are fatal to the worms, and dead specimens are often found on the surface following the application of substances such as DDT, lime sulphur, and lead arsenate. In Australia, changes in farming practices such as the application of superphosphates on pastures and a switch from pastoral farming to arable farming had a devastating effect on populations of the giant Gippsland earthworm, leading to their classification as a protected species. Globally, certain earthworms populations have been devastated by deviation from organic production and the spraying of synthetic fertilizers and biocides, with at least three species now listed as extinct but many more endangered.
This earthworm activity aerates and mixes the soil, and is conducive to mineralization of nutrients and their uptake by vegetation. Certain species of earthworm come to the surface and graze on the higher concentrations of organic matter present there, mixing it with the mineral soil. Because a high level of organic matter mixing is associated with soil fertility, an abundance of earthworms is generally considered beneficial by farmers and gardeners. As long ago as 1881 Charles Darwin wrote: "It may be doubted whether there are many other animals which have played so important a part in the history of the world, as have these lowly organized creatures."

Also, while, as the name suggests, the main habitat of earthworms is in soil, they are not restricted to this habitat. The brandling worm Eisenia fetida lives in decaying plant matter and manure. Arctiostrotus vancouverensis from Vancouver Island and the Olympic Peninsula is generally found in decaying conifer logs. Aporrectodea limicola, Sparganophilus spp., and several others are found in mud in streams. Some species are arboreal, some aquatic and some euryhaline (salt-water tolerant) and littoral (living on the sea-shore, e.g. Pontodrilus litoralis). Even in the soil species, special habitats, such as soils derived from serpentine, have an earthworm fauna of their own.

Vermicomposting of organic "wastes" and addition of this organic matter to the soil, preferably as a surface mulch, will provide several species of earthworms with their food and nutrient requirements, and will create the optimum conditions of temperature and moisture that will stimulate their activity.

Earthworms are environmental indicators of soil health. Earthworms feed on the decaying matter in the soil and analyzing the contents of their digestive tracts gives insight into the overall condition of the soil. The earthworm gut accumulates chemicals, including heavy metals such as cadmium, mercury, zinc, and copper. The population size of the earthworm indicates the quality of the soil, as healthy soil would contain a larger number of earthworms.

Environmental impacts 
The major benefits of earthworm activities to soil fertility for agriculture can be summarized as:
 Biological: In many soils, earthworms play a major role in the conversion of large pieces of organic matter into rich humus, thus improving soil fertility. This is achieved by the worm's actions of pulling below the surface deposited organic matter such as leaf fall or manure, either for food or to plug its burrow. Once in the burrow, the worm will shred the leaf, partially digest it and mingle it with the earth. Worm casts (see bottom right) can contain 40 percent more humus than the top  of soil in which the worm is living.

 Chemical: In addition to dead organic matter, the earthworm also ingests any other soil particles that are small enough—including sand grains up to —into its gizzard, wherein those minute fragments of grit grind everything into a fine paste which is then digested in the intestine. When the worm excretes this in the form of casts, deposited on the surface or deeper in the soil, minerals and plant nutrients are changed to an accessible form for plants to use. Investigations in the United States show that fresh earthworm casts are five times richer in available nitrogen, seven times richer in available phosphates, and 11 times richer in available potassium than the surrounding upper  of soil.
 Physical: The earthworm's burrowing creates a multitude of channels through the soil and is of great value in maintaining the soil structure, enabling processes of aeration and drainage. Permaculture co-founder Bill Mollison points out that by sliding in their tunnels, earthworms "act as an innumerable army of pistons pumping air in and out of the soils on a 24-hour cycle (more rapidly at night)". Thus, the earthworm not only creates passages for air and water to traverse the soil, but also modifies the vital organic component that makes a soil healthy (see Bioturbation). Earthworms promote the formation of nutrient-rich casts (globules of soil, stable in soil mucus) that have high soil aggregation and soil fertility and quality. In podzol soils, earthworms can obliterate the characteristic banded appearance of the soil profile by mixing the organic (LFH), eluvial (E) and upper illuvial (B) horizons to create a single dark Ap horizon.

Earthworms accelerate nutrient cycling in the soil-plant system through fragmentation & mixing of plant debris – physical grinding & chemical digestion. The earthworm's existence cannot be taken for granted. Dr. W. E. Shewell-Cooper observed "tremendous numerical differences between adjacent gardens", and worm populations are affected by a host of environmental factors, many of which can be influenced by good management practices on the part of the gardener or farmer.

Richly organic topsoil populations of earthworms are much higher – averaging  and up to 400 g2 – such that, for the 7 billion of us, each person alive today has support of 7 million earthworms.

The ability to break down organic materials and excrete concentrated nutrients makes the earthworm a functional contributor in restoration projects. In response to ecosystem disturbances, some sites have utilized earthworms to prepare soil for the return of native flora. Research from the Station d'écologie Tropicale de Lamto asserts that the earthworms positively influence the rate of macroaggregate formation, an important feature for soil structure. The stability of aggregates in response to water was also found to be improved when constructed by earthworms.

Though not fully quantified yet, greenhouse gas emissions of earthworms likely contribute to global warming, especially since top-dwelling earthworms increase the speed of carbon cycles and have been spread by humans into many new geographies.

Economic impact 

Various species of worms are used in vermiculture, the practice of feeding organic waste to earthworms to decompose food waste. These are usually Eisenia fetida (or its close relative Eisenia andrei) or the brandling worm, commonly known as the tiger worm or red wiggler. They are distinct from soil-dwelling earthworms. In the tropics, the African nightcrawler Eudrilus eugeniae and the Indian blue Perionyx excavatus are used.

Earthworms are sold all over the world; the market is sizable. According to Doug Collicutt, "In 1980, 370 million worms were exported from Canada, with a Canadian export value of $13 million and an American retail value of $54 million."

Earthworms provide an excellent source of protein for fish, fowl and pigs but were also used traditionally for human consumption. Noke is a culinary term used by the Māori of New Zealand, and refers to earthworms which are considered delicacies for their chiefs.

See also 
 Drilosphere, the part of the soil influenced by earthworm secretions and castings
 The Formation of Vegetable Mould through the Action of Worms, an 1881 book by Charles Darwin
 Soil life
 Vermicompost
 Vermifilter
 Vermifilter toilet
 Worm charming

References

Works cited

Further reading 
 Edwards, Clive A. (ed.) Earthworm Ecology. Boca Raton: CRC Press, 2004. Second revised edition. 
 Lee, Keneth E. Earthworms: Their Ecology and Relationships with Soils and Land Use. Academic Press. Sydney, 1985. 
 Stewart, Amy. The Earth Moved: On the Remarkable Achievements of Earthworms. Chapel Hill, N.C.: Algonquin Books, 2004.

External links 
 
 
 

Annelids
Invertebrate common names
Paraphyletic groups
Soil biology

lt:Sliekas